Edward James 'Eddie' Brown (born 27 November 2000) is an English professional footballer who plays for Hyde United.

Career 
Brown made his senior debut for Bolton in a 2–0 away defeat against Wycombe Wanderers.

Career statistics

Notes

References

2000 births
Living people
English footballers
Association football forwards
Bolton Wanderers F.C. players
English Football League players